Ameli may refer to:

Ameli, Eritrea, a town
Ameli, Duchess of Oldenburg (1923–2016)
Ameli Koloska (born 1944), West German retired javelin thrower
CETME Ameli, a Spanish light machine gun

See also
Amalie (disambiguation)
Amelia (disambiguation)
Amelie (disambiguation)